The 2021 MTV Video Music Awards Japan were held on December 18, 2021.

Main awards

Best video of the year
Official Hige Dandism - "Cry Baby"

Best solo artist video
Japan
Gen Hoshino - "Fushigi"

International
Billie Eilish - "Happier Than Ever"

Best group video
Japan
Official Hige Dandism - "Cry Baby"
International
BTS - "Butter"

Best new artist video
Japan
Sakurazaka46 - "Nagaredama"
International
Olivia Rodrigo - "Drivers License"

Best collaboration video
Japan
Millennium Parade - "U"
International
Coldplay, BTS - "My Universe"

Best rock video
Ryokuoushoku Shakai - "Litmus"

Best alternative video
Zutomayo - "Kuraku Kuroku"

Best pop video
Milet - "Ordinary Days"

Best hip hop video
Sky-Hi - "To The First"

Best Latin video
The Rampage - Heatwave

Best dance video
JO1 - "Real"

Best art direction video
Hinatazaka46 - "Tteka"

Best visual effects
Vaundy - "Shiwaawase"

Best shooting
Aina the End - "Kinmokusei"

Best choreography
Daichi Miura - "Backwards"

Special awards

Best artist
Yoasobi

Best song
Yuuri – "Dry Flower"

Best album
Official Hige Dandism - Editorial

MTV Pop The World award
Nogizaka46

Best buzz award
NiziU

Rising Star award
Be First

MTV breakthrough Song
Ado – "Usseewa"

References

2021 in Japanese music
2021 music awards